The Henry Chisholm was a wooden freighter; it was sunk off the shore of Isle Royale in Lake Superior in 1898 and the remains are still on the lake bottom.  The wreck was placed on the National Register of Historic Places in 1984.

History

The Henry Chisholm (Official number 95610) was built in 1880 at Thomas Quayle & Sons shipyards in Cleveland, Ohio, which was considered the best wooden shipbuilders on the Great Lakes.  She was a 265-foot wooden steam-powered freighter, 39 feet in breadth and 20 feet in depth, carrying three masts and a double expansion steam engine with twin Scotch boilers capable of producing 1707HP, powering a single screw.  The hull was reinforced with steel and iron strapping, and was the largest wooden "steam barge" ever built in Cleveland, approaching the practical size limit for a wooden vessel of its type.  The ship cost $125,999 to build, and was launched on August 28, 1880.

The ship was built for Alva Bradley of Cleveland, and named for Henry Chisholm, father of the steel industry in that city. It was used on the Great Lakes from the time it was built until 1898, and frequently set records for cargo capacity, often towing several barges at once.

The wreck of the Chisholm
The Chisholm left Duluth, Minnesota on October 16, 1898 bound for Buffalo, New York, carrying 92,000 bushels of barley and towing the 220-foot schooner John Martin.  The next day a heavy storm blew in and the tow rope to the Martin was cast off.  After the gale lessened, the Chisholm spent the next few days searching for the Martin. On October 20, 1898 the ship struck a reef near the Rock of Ages Light while attempting to enter Washington Harbor.  Determining the hull was too badly damaged to refloat, the captain abandoned ship, sending several crewmembers to Victoria Harbor for assistance while taking the remainder of the crew into Washington Harbor.  The Martin was later found, essentially unharmed and sailing under her own power.

Salvage began almost immediately, but the ship broke up and sank during storms a week later.  The Scotch boilers were salvaged in 1901, but by that time the engine had slid downhill away from the wreck.  The Chisholm sat mostly undisturbed until she was rediscovered by sport divers in the 1960s.

The wreck today
The Henry Chisholm sits in waters of 80 to 150 feet, lying on its side. Portions of the wooden hull are intermingled with the wreckage of the Cumberland, which had sunk earlier in 1877.  The stern of the ship is broken away from the rest of the wreckage, and sits some distance away.

The steam engine, drive shaft and prop are intact in the stern section, sitting upright at the 120–150 foot depth.  The steam engine is of the double expansion variety, 20 feet high, and is in nearly perfect condition, easily viewable and accessible through the sheared-off stern. Approximately 75 dives were made to the Chisholm in 2009 out of 1062 dives made to wrecks in the Isle Royale National Park.

References

Further reading

Shipwrecks on the National Register of Historic Places in Michigan
Great Lakes freighters
Maritime incidents in 1898
Shipwrecks of Lake Superior
1880 ships
Ships built in Cleveland
National Register of Historic Places in Isle Royale National Park
Wreck diving sites